In taxonomy, Roseibium is a genus of the Hyphomicrobiales.

References

Further reading

Scientific articles

Scientific books

Scientific databases

External links

Hyphomicrobiales
Bacteria genera